The Will (Book)

The Will (English rendering of Al-Wasiyyat [Urdu]) is a work of Mirza Ghulam Ahmad, who claimed to be the promised Messiah and Mahdi in Islam, the founder of the Ahmadiyya Muslim Community. The Will was published on 24 December 1905.

Contents
The author Mirza Ghulam Ahmad claimed that he had been receiving continuously, revelations to the effect, that his death was very near.

Message

The book reiterates some of his claims and admonishes his audience. He foretells of "Death and destruction" all over the World. He gives glad tidings to his followers, about future successes and claims, God revealed to him:

"You are a Warner on my behalf. I have sent you so that the guilty ones be separated from the righteous," And "A Warner came unto the world but the world accepted him not, yet God will accept him and demonstrate his truthfulness with mighty onslaughts." And "I shall bless thee, so much so, that kings shall seek blessings from thy garments." (The Will, page 4.)

Two Manifestations

Ahmad proclaimed that there were two Manifestations of God's Might. One is Prophethood and then there is a Second Manifestation when a Prophet has died, the Qudrat-e-Thaniyya (The Second Might). He writes:
"Allah lets them (Prophets) sow the seed of the truth, but He does not let it come to full fruition at the prophet’s hands. He causes them to die at such time as apparently forebodes a kind of failure. This thereby provides an opportunity for the opponents to laugh at, ridicule, taunt and reproach the Prophets. And after they have had their fill of ridicule and reproach, He reveals yet another dimension of His Might and creates such means by which the objectives which had to some extent remained incomplete are fully realized.(page. 5)"

Second Manifestation is  خلافة or Khilāfa

The author Mirza Ghulam Ahmad has described in clear words what he meant by the Second Manifestation or Qudrat-e-Thaniyya. He gave three examples, Muhammad being followed by Abu Bakr, Moses followed by Joshua son of Nun and Jesus son of Mary followed by Peter, all three holding the communities of their Messengers from going into dispersion after the death of the head of the community, and at the critical time of great distress. Ahmad writes:

 "Thus He manifests two kinds of Power. (1) First He shows the Hand of His Power at the hands of His Prophets themselves. (2) Second, when with the death of a Prophet, difficulties and problems arise and the enemy feels stronger and thinks that things are in disarray and is convinced that now this Jama‘at will become extinct and even members of the Jama‘at, too, are in a quandary and their backs are broken, and some of the unfortunate ones choose paths that lead to apostasy, then it is that God for the second time, who shows His Mighty Power and supports and takes care of the shaken Jama‘at... This is what happened at the time of Hadrat Abu Bakr Siddiq, when the demise of the Holy Prophet was considered untimely and many an ignorant Bedouin turned apostate.... Then Allah raised Abu Bakr Siddiq and showed for the second time the manifestation of His Power and saved Islam... That is also what happened at the time of Moses, when he died on his way from Egypt to Kin‘an before taking the Israelites to the intended destination in accordance with the promise.... the same happened with Christ. At the time of the incident of Crucifixion, all his disciples scattered and even one of them apostatized." (page 6-7)

Ever-lasting Promise

Ahmad has conveyed to his community that this Sunnatullah (the Practice of God) would not change even after his departure from this world. The Second Manifestation will appear and will stay with the Ahmadiyya Muslim Community till the day of Judgement. He wrote:

 "So dear friends! since it is the Sunnatullah (the Practice of God), from time immemorial, that God Almighty shows two Manifestations, so that the two false joys of the opponents be put to an end, it is not possible now that God should relinquish His Sunnah (practice) of old. So do not grieve over what I have said to you; nor should your hearts be distressed. For it is essential for you to witness the second Manifestation also, and its Coming is better for you because it is everlasting, the continuity of which will not end till the Day of Judgement. And that second Manifestation cannot come unless I depart. But when I depart, God will send that second Manifestation for you which shall always stay with you just as promised by God in Brahin-e-Ahmadiyya." (page 7)

The Ahmadis believes that the prophecy has fulfilled in the form of Ahmadiyya Khilafa. The current Head of the Community Mirza Masroor Ahmad is the Fifth successor to Mirza Ghulam Ahmad.

A New Financial System

Besides the administrative and spiritual continuity of the structure of the Community, Ghulam Ahmad gave a permanent financial system to the Ahmadiyya Muslim Community in the form Al-Wassiyyat (the Will). He claimed God revealed to him a place, which was the abode of the heavenly souls. A Bahishti Maqbara (Heavenly Graveyard). He wrote:
"...the resting place of such members of the Jama‘at (Community) as are pure of heart and who have in reality given precedence to Faith over the world and who have renounced the love of the world and have submitted themselves to God and have brought about in themselves a holy change and, like the companions of the Holy Prophet, have set the example of Faithfulness and Truthfulness...I pray: O my Mighty and Benevolent [God!] O Forgiving and Merciful God, do grant them alone a place for graves here who have true faith in this messenger of Yours and who have no trace of hypocrisy, of selfish motives and of doubt or suspicion in their hearts..." (page 23)

Conditions of burial

Ghulam Ahmad laid down certain conditions for those who wish to be buried at this Graveyard. He proposed that for anyone to be buried in Bahishti Maqbara, the following three requirements be fulfilled:

The Ahmadiyya believe this  New Financial System of Al-Wassiyyat is the Foundation of a New World Order.

Uses and Growth of Funds

Ahmad believed that with the increase in the strength of the Community, huge monetary funds shall be collected. He devised a system of Board of Trustees called The Anjuman. All such funds will be in the custody of the Anjuman.

"...whose members should be honest and knowledgeable, and they, with mutual consultation, and according to the directions laid down above, shall use the funds for the advancement of Islam, dissemination of the Qur’anic knowledge, publishing religious books, and for [the expenses of] missionaries of the Jama‘at. It is the promise of God, that He will cause the Jama‘at to flourish, so it is expected that abundance of funds will be forthcoming for the propagation of Islam. Every matter pertaining to the proposals about the propagation of Islam, going into the details of which will be premature, will be paid for, out of these funds. And when a party of those who are made responsible for discharging these duties passes away, those who succeed them, shall be duty-bound to render all those services in accordance with the instructions of Silsila Ahmadiyya." (page 28)

"These funds shall also be used to help such orphans, poor and needy people, and new converts as do not have sufficient means of livelihood. And it shall be permissible to augment these funds through trade and commerce. Do not think that these things which I have said are inconceivable. No, they are the Will of that Mighty One Who is the Lord of the earth and the heaven. I am not worried how these funds will be collected, nor do I grieve over how such a Jama‘at will be raised who, inspired by their faith, shall perform such heroic feats. Rather, I am worried that, after I am gone, those who will be entrusted with these funds may not, seeing their abundance, stumble and fall in love with the world. So I pray that such honest people may always be found by the Jama‘at who work for God alone. However, it shall be lawful that those who have no means to support themselves should be given something from these funds by way of assistance." (page 28)

References

Works by Mirza Ghulam Ahmad
1905 books
20th-century Indian books
Indian religious texts
Islamic theology books